The 2023 Almaty City Mäslihat election is scheduled to be held on 19 March 2023 to elect 34 deputies of the city mäslihat (local assembly) as part of nationwide local races. The newly elected five-year term composition of the Mäslihat will be formed by a mixed electoral system for the first time, in which half of the seats are elected from single-member districts and party-list proportional representation, respectively.

Background 
The 2021 City Mäslihat elections were previously held under the party-list proportional representation system to elect a total of 39 seats in the Almaty City Mäslihat, which saw ruling Nur Otan party (now Amanat sweep majority of 29 seats, following by Aq Jol (15 seats), Auyl (3 seats), and the People's Party (3 seats), with the newly rebranded Adal narrowly failing to win enough votes in order to earn mandates in the City Mäslihat. From there, Stanislav Kankurov, the first deputy chairman of the Nur Otan party in Almaty, was subsequently elected as the mäslihat's new secretary for the first time since 2014 during its opening session of the 7th convocation.

References 

Elections in Almaty
2023 elections in Kazakhstan
March 2023 events in Kazakhstan